Alexander Thomson of Banchory FRSE (1798–1868) was a 19th-century Scottish advocate, agriculturalist, antiquary, author, philanthropist and traveller. He owned an estate at Banchory-Devenick in Aberdeenshire. After qualifying as an advocate in Edinburgh he returned to the estate and did not pursue a career at the bar preferring to follow the life of a country gentleman. He travelled extensively in Europe, spending many years studying overseas. He settled crofters on his estate and planted many trees. His position in life allowed to give time to many interests including antiquarian studies, geology, biology and social reform. He attempted to unite Marischal and King's Colleges in Aberdeen University. At the Dirsuption he sided with the Free Church and was a prominent leader in that cause. He died in 1868 and bequeathed a sizeable museum and collection of books to the church. He also gave a substantial amount of money to set up a Free Church College in Aberdeen.

Early life and education
He was born on 21 June 1798, the son of Andrew Thomson of Banchory (1774-1806), and his wife, Helen Hamilton (1774-1851). Thomson's mother Helen, was a daughter of Dr. Robert Hamilton, Professor of Natural Philosophy in Marischal College. His father, Andrew, died in 1806, aged thirty-two years, and was succeeded by his son, Alexander, a boy of eight years. Alexander was educated at the Grammar School of Aberdeen, and Marischal College, and graduated in arts in 1816. He then proceeded to Edinburgh, and studied for the Scottish Bar. He  joined  the  Speculative  Society,  and  took  a  share  in  the debates. He  passed  Advocate  in  1820,  but  never  practised  at  the  bar. Besides  his  legal  and  cognate  studies,  Mr  Thomson, whilst  in  Edinburgh,  began  the  study  of  Italian. He erected a mansion house of Banchory on the site of the old one. The house stands on a fine elevated position, and is a large and commodious structure, with the front and entrance towards the south. The gardens are large, and enclosed with very high walls. There are two approaches to the house — one on the east and the other on the west — and the pleasure grounds are extensive. In 1823 he was elected a Fellow of the Royal Society of Edinburgh. His proposer was Sir William Hamilton, 9th Baronet.

Marriage and grand tour
From 1818 to 1863 he travelled extensively in Europe and kept a diary of his travels. In  1825  Mr  Thomson  was  married  to  Jessy,  daughter  of  Alexander Fraser,  Esq.,  an  ex-Lord  Provost  of  Aberdeen.  The  following  year  Mr and  Mrs  Thomson  visited  Holland,  Germany,  Switzerland,  and  Italy. During  the  journey,  Mr  Thomson  made  copious  notes  of  his  observations on  the  state  of  education  in  these  countries,  and  their  social  and  moral  condition.  They  spent  about  three  years  in  Florence,  Rome,  and  Naples, Antiquities,  the  geology  and  vegetation  of  the  country,  and  more  particularly its  social  and  religious  state,  engaged  his  attention ;  and  he carefully  studied  the  doctrines  and  practices  of  Roman Catholicism. Mr  and  Mrs  Thomson  returned  to  Banchory  in  1829.

Activities at home
In 1826 he returned to Aberdeen as Dean of the Faculty of Law.
Resuming  his public  duties  and  literary  and  scientific  pursuits,  Mr  Thomson  shewed  a deepened  seriousness  and  increased  interest  in  religious  objects. He withdrew  from  attendance  on  the  ministrations  of  the  parish  clergyman, a  Moderate,  and  attended  the  Evangelical  preaching  of  ministers  in  Aberdeen such as Alexander Dyce Davidson. In  1833  Mr  Thomson  spent  a  few  months  in  Edinburgh,  and  having  heard  the  discussions  about  patronage,  as  a  Conservative,  his  fears  were  aroused  "lest  anything  rash  should  be  done." In  1834  he  published  "Facts  from Rome ; "  and  contributed  a  sketch  of  Dr  Hamilton  to  the  Encyclopoedia Britannica. In  1835  he  visited  Belgium  ;  and  brought  before  the  Highland  Society  the  plan  followed  in  that  country  for  reclaiming  waste  land,  and for  cultivating  flax  and  chicory. He is reported to have planted over a million trees in less than two decades.

The ten years' conflict
He  also corresponded  frankly  with  Lord Aberdeen  on  the  question.

At the Disruption
In the Disruption of 1843, Mr. Thomson took an active part, and spent time and means in promoting the cause of the Free Church. Thomas Chalmers visited Thomson at Banchory House in September, 1843 and on 10 September,  Chalmers preached on the lawn to a great assemblage. In the General Assembly of the Free Church of 1844, Mr. Thomson proposed a scheme for providing manses to the ministers; and the institution of a Theological Hall in Aberdeen was warmly supported by him.

Other pursuits

In 1852 Thomson published Social Evils: Their Causes and Their Cure. In 1855 Aberdeen University awarded him an honorary doctorate (LLD). He occasionally directed his attention to antiquarian and geological subjects, and also inquiries touching the social condition of the people. He  had  co-operated  with  Sheriff  Watson  in planting  in  Aberdeen  the  first  "Ragged  School"  attempted  in  Scotland; and  he  continued  to  help the  Sheriff  in  extending  the  experiment. In 1859, when Albert, Prince Consort presided at the meeting of the British Association held at Aberdeen, Thomson entertained the Prince at Banchory House. In commemoration of this event, he erected a granite obelisk on the Cotcraig Rock at Tollo Hill. Though his health began to fail, he still continued to pursue the subjects which interested him, and published a number of pamphlets on antiquarian and scientific subjects.

Death and legacy
He died on the 20 May, 1868, at the age of seventy years. Under his trust settlement he bequeathed to the Free Church College of Aberdeen, £16,000, and also the very valuable Library and Museum which he had collected at Banchory House. He was the founder of the Thomson Science Lectureship in the College.

Thomson is buried in the graveyard of St Devenicks-on-the-Hill in Banchory.

He bequeathed over 1600 books and 6000 pamphlets to the Free Church College in Aberdeen. These are now held by Aberdeen University.

His memoirs were collected and published by Rev George Smeaton in 1869.

John Knox's watch

In  the  museum  of  Free  Church  College,  Aberdeen  there  is  deposited an antique watch which  Mr  Thomson  possessed  as  an  heirloom from  his  ancestor: John Knox.  Thomson wrote: "The  unvarying  tradition  is that the  watch  was  the  property  of  the  great  Reformer,  and,  further,  that  it  was  presented to  him  by  Queen  Mary  on  some  occasion  when she  wished  to show  favour  to  him,   and  that it  has  even  since  been  preserved  as  an  heirloom in  the  family.  In  those  days  watches  were  rare,  and  such  an  one  was  no  unsuitable  gift  even from  Royalty."

The familial connection with Knox is given in Murdoch-Lawrance:

Alexander  Thomson  was  born  21  June,  1798, at  Banchory  House,  near  Aberdeen. By  the latter  marriage  there  was  a  daughter,  Margaret, who  was  married  to  Dr  Andrew  Skene,  of  Aberdeen. Dr  Skene  left  several  children,  the  eldest  of  whom,  Dr  Andrew  Skene,  had  by  his  wife, Margaret  Lumsden,  daughter  of  Lumsden  of Cushnie,  three  sons  and  four  daughters. One  of  the  daughters — Mary — married  in 1769  Andrew  Thomson  of  Banchory,  who  had issue  by  her — Margaret,  Andrew,  and  Alexander. At  an  early  age  Alexander was  sent  to  the  Aberdeen  Grammar  School. From  the  Grammar  School  he  proceeded  to Marischal  College,  where  his  grandfather. He  graduated  in April,  1816. He  married  on  14  February, 1825,  Janet  (more  frequently  called  Jessy) Fraser  (born  14  February 1799; died  8 August 1870),  daughter  of Provost Alexander Fraser.

Publications
On the Settlement of Crofters
On the Cultivation of Chicory and Flax in Belgium
Our Treatment of the Lower and Lowest Classes of Society
Prevention is Better than Cure
On the Materials used in Buildings by the ancient Romans
On the Hills and Valleys, and the Walls and Gates of Rome
On the Ancient Tombs of Rome and its immediate vicinity
Punishment and prevention (1857)
The Water Works of the Ancient Romans, the Natural Springs, Aqueducts, Reservoirs, Baths, and Drains of Rome
On the Triumphal and Monumental Pillars and Arches of Rome
Scottish Episcopacy past and present (1860)
Report on the Aberdeen Industrial Feeding Schools

Artistic recognition

His photographic portrait, by Hill & Adamson, is held by the Scottish National Portrait Gallery.

Family
In 1825 he married Jessie Fraser (1799-1870). They had no children.

References

Citations

Sources

External links

1798 births
1868 deaths
Alumni of the University of Aberdeen
Scottish lawyers
Scottish philanthropists
Fellows of the Royal Society of Edinburgh
19th-century British philanthropists
Free Church of Scotland people